Greta Mjöll Samúelsdóttir (born 5 September 1987) is an Icelandic singer and a retired international footballer. Greta represented Breiðablik in the Úrvalsdeild her entire career, excepting university stints in the United States.

Sports career
Club
She played with Breiðablik her entire senior career, but had many stints playing at university level in the USA while she studied there. She won the league with Breiðablik in 2005 and the Icelandic Women's Cup in 2005 and 2013. She was forced to retire after the 2013 season due to a persisting knee injury.

International
Greta played 28 games and scored three goals for Iceland during her career.

International performance

International goals

Honours
 Icelandic champion: 2005
 Icelandic Women's Cup: 2005, 2013

Music career
Greta Mjöll participated in Söngvakeppnin, the Icelandic qualifiers  for the Eurovision Song Contest 2014, performing the song "Eftir eitt lag". She managed to proceed from the semi-finals to the finals, held on 15 February 2014. She did not qualify to the superfinal.

Discography

Singles
2014: "Eftir eitt lag"

References

External links

1987 births
Living people
Greta Mjoll Samuelsdottir
Greta Mjoll Samuelsdottir
Greta Mjoll Samuelsdottir
Greta Mjoll Samuelsdottir
Women's association football midfielders
21st-century Icelandic women singers